Herminium is a genus of plants in family Orchidaceae, widespread across much of Europe and Asia.

Species 
Species accepted as of March 2018:
Herminium alaschanicum Maxim. – Mongolia to China and C. Nepal.
Herminium albomarginatum (King) X.H.Jin – C. & E. Himalaya
Herminium albosanguineum (Renz) X.H.Jin – C. Bhutan
Herminium albovirens (Renz) X.H.Jin – Sikkim to Bhutan
Herminium biporosum Maxim. – E. Qinghai to China (NE. Shanxi, Yunnan)
Herminium bulleyi (Rolfe) Tang & F.T.Wang – China (W. Sichuan, N. Yunnan)
Herminium chloranthum Tang & F.T.Wang – S. Tibet to C. Nepal and China (W. Sichuan, NW. Yunnan)
Herminium clavigerum (Lindl.) X.H.Jin – Himalaya to S. Tibet
Herminium coeloceras (Finet) Schltr. – E. & SE. Tibet to China (W. Sichuan, N. Yunnan) and N. Myanmar
Herminium coiloglossum Schltr. – China (Yunnan)
Herminium ecalcaratum (Finet) Schltr. – China (W. Sichuan, NW. Yunnan)
Herminium edgeworthii (Hook.f. ex Collett) X.H.Jin – Pakistan to Himalaya
Herminium elisabethae (Duthie) Tang & F.T.Wang – Himalaya to Tibet
Herminium fallax (Lindl.) Hook.f. – Himalaya to China (SW. Sichuan, NW. Yunnan)
Herminium fimbriatum (Raskoti) X.H.Jin – Nepal
Herminium forceps (Finet) Schltr. – SE. Tibet to C. China
Herminium glossophyllum Tang & F.T.Wang – China (SW. Sichuan, NW. Yunnan)
Herminium gracile King & Pantl. – Sikkim to C. China
Herminium handelii X.H.Jin – C. & E. Himalaya to China (Yunnan)
Herminium himalayanum (Renz) X.H.Jin – Bhutan to Tibet
Herminium hongdeyuanii Raskoti – Nepal
Herminium humidicola (K.Y.Lang & D.S.Deng) X.H.Jin – SE. Qinghai to China (Gansu)
Herminium jaffreyanum King & Pantl. – E. Nepal to E. Himalaya
Herminium josephi Rchb.f. – WC. Himalaya to China (W. Sichuan, N. Yunnan)
Herminium kalimpongense Pradhan – Darjiling (Kalimpong)
Herminium kamengense A.N.Rao – E. Nepal, Arunachal Pradesh
Herminium kumaunense Deva & H.B.Naithani – Himalaya
Herminium lanceum (Thunb. ex Sw.) Vuijk – Mongolia to Trop. Asia
Herminium latilabre (Lindl.) X.H.Jin – N. Pakistan to China (SE. Sichuan, N. Yunnan)
Herminium longilobatum S.N.Hegde & A.N.Rao – E. Nepal, Arunachal Pradesh
Herminium mackinonii Duthie – Himalaya
Herminium macrophyllum (D.Don) Dandy – Pakistan to Himalaya and S. Tibet
Herminium mannii (Rchb.f.) Tang & F.T.Wang – E. Nepal to China (S. Sichuan, W. & C. Yunnan)
Herminium monophyllum (D.Don) P.F.Hunt & Summerh. – Himalaya
Herminium monorchis (L.) R.Br. in W.T.Aiton – Temp. Eurasia to Himalaya
Herminium neotineoides Ames & Schltr. – China (W. Sichuan)
Herminium ophioglossoides Schltr. – Qinghai to China (W. Sichuan to NW. & C. Yunnan)
Herminium oxysepalum (K.Y.Lang) X.H.Jin – China (NW. Yunnan)
Herminium pugioniforme Lindl. ex Hook.f. – Himalaya to SC. China
Herminium pusillum Ohwi & Fukuy. – C. Nepal, Korea (Mt. Baekdu), C. Japan, C. Taiwan
Herminium pygmaeum Renz – Bhutan to Tibet
Herminium quinquelobum King & Pantl. – C. & E. Himalaya to China (NW. Yunnan)
Herminium singulum Tang & F.T.Wang – China (SW. Sichuan, NW. Yunnan)
Herminium souliei (Finet) Rolfe – C. Nepal, SE. Tibet to China (W. Sichuan, NE. & W. Yunnan)
Herminium suave Tang & F.T.Wang – China (SW. Sichuan, N. Yunnan)
Herminium tangianum (S.Y.Hu) K.Y.Lang – China (C. Yunnan)
Herminium tibeticum X.H.Jin – Tibet
Herminium wangianum X.H.Jin – SE. Tibet to China (SW. Sichuan, NW. Yunnan)
Herminium yunnanense Rolfe – China (W. & C. Yunnan)

References

External links 

 
Orchideae genera
Taxonomy articles created by Polbot